The men's ISSF 25 meter rapid fire pistol was one of the thirteen shooting events at the 1988 Summer Olympics. The last Olympic competition on the non-circular target, and the first to feature final shooting, it was won by Latvian Afanasijs Kuzmins after a perfect 300 in the first stage, 298 in the second, and two perfect 50 series in the final, thus not allowing Ralf Schumann and John McNally to eliminate his one-point pre-final lead. It was the first gold medal for the Soviet Union in the event. Schumann comfortably won the silver while McNally fell back during the final with a 47 and a 46, finishing seventh and giving way to a third-place tie between Zoltán Kovács and Alberto Sevieri, resolved in Kovács's favour on grounds of higher final score. The bronze was Hungary's first rapid fire pistol since 1952. There were 32 competitors from 23 nations. Each nation had been limited to two shooters since the 1952 Games.

Background

This was the 18th appearance of what had been standardised in 1948 as the men's ISSF 25 meter rapid fire pistol event, the only event on the 2020 programme that traces back to 1896. The event has been held at every Summer Olympics except 1904 and 1928 (when no shooting events were held) and 1908; it was nominally open to women from 1968 to 1980, although very few women participated these years. The first five events were quite different, with some level of consistency finally beginning with the 1932 event—which, though it had differences from the 1924 competition, was roughly similar. The 1936 competition followed the 1932 one quite closely. The post-World War II event substantially altered the competition once again. The 1984 Games introduced women's-only shooting events, including the ISSF 25 meter pistol (though this was more similar to the non-Olympic men's ISSF 25 meter center-fire pistol than the rapid fire pistol).

Five of the top 10 shooters from 1984 returned: silver medalist (and 1980 gold medalist) Corneliu Ion of Romania, fourth-place finisher Delival Nobre of Brazil, fifth-place finisher Yang Chung-yeol of South Korea, eighth-place finisher Bernardo Tovar of Colombia, and tenth-place finisher Juan Seguí of Spain. Afanasijs Kuzmins of the Soviet Union, who had placed 6th in 1980 and not competed in 1984 due to the Soviet-led boycott, also returned. Poland had taken the top two spots at the 1986 world championships; winner Adam Kaczmarek competed in Seoul but runner-up Andrzej Macur did not. The third-place finisher at the world championships, Ralf Schumann of East Germany, was also the world record holder.

For the first time, no nations made their debut in the event. The United States made its 15th appearance, most of any nation.

Competition format

The competition format introduced a two-round tournament for the first time, using a qualifying round and a final.

The qualifying round was essentially the same as the full competition format from 1948–1984. Each shooter fired 60 shots. These were done in two courses of 30; each course consisted of two stages of 15; each stage consisted of three series of 5. In each stage, the time limit for each series was 8 seconds for the first, 6 seconds for the second, and 4 seconds for the third. 

The new final consisted of two series of 5 shots each, scored normally. The top eight shooters advanced to the final. Ties to get into the final were broken first by the total of the two 4-second series in the second course, then the two 6-second series in the second course, then the two 8-second series in the second course, then the 4-, 6-, and 8-second series in order in the first course. Ties in the final were broken first by the total of the two series in the final.

A holdover from the previous Games was that silhouettes, rather than round targets, continued to be used; however, scoring rings had been added so that now each shot was scored up to 10 rather than being strictly hit or miss.

One change from 1948–1956 was that hits were no longer the primary measurement of success. As in 1960–1984, ranking was done by score, regardless of hits.

Records

Prior to the competition, the existing world and Olympic records were as follows.

Afanasijs Kuzmins set a new Olympic record for the 60-shot qualifying round at 598; Ralf Schumann and John McNally were 1 point behind him in tying the old record at 597.

Kuzmins also set the initial record for the new 70-shot total qualifying plus final at 698.

Schedule

All times are Korea Standard Time adjusted for daylight savings (UTC+10)

Results

Qualifying

Final

Kovács' final score of 99 broke the tie for bronze medal in his favor over Sevieri's 97.

References

Sources

Shooting at the 1988 Summer Olympics
Men's 1988
Men's events at the 1988 Summer Olympics